Birasoherpia is a genus of cavibelonian solenogaster, a kind of shell-less, worm-like mollusk.

References

Cavibelonia